Python Tools for Visual Studio (PTVS) is a free and open-source plug-in for versions of Visual Studio up to VS 2015 providing support for programming in Python. Since VS 2017, it is integrated in VS and called Python Support in Visual Studio. It supports IntelliSense, debugging, profiling, MPI cluster debugging, mixed C++/Python debugging, and more. It is released under the Apache License 2.0, and is developed primarily by Microsoft.

The first version was on March 8, 2011. The latest version for VS 2015 is 2.2.6.

See also

 
 List of Python software
 R Tools for Visual Studio

References

External links

Integrated development environments
Microsoft free software
Python (programming language) software
Software using the Apache license
2011 software
Windows-only free software